The 1978–79 FIBA European Cup Winners' Cup was the thirteenth edition of FIBA's 2nd-tier level European-wide professional club basketball competition, contested between national domestic cup champions, running from 1 November 1978, to 22 March 1979. It was contested by 20 teams, two less than in the previous edition.

Gabetti Cantù defeated the Dutch League club, Den Bosch, in a final held in Poreč, winning the FIBA European Cup Winner's Cup for the third consecutive time.

Participants

First round

|}

Second round

|}

Automatically qualified to the quarter finals
 Gabetti Cantù (title holder)
 Sinudyne Bologna
 ASVEL

Quarterfinals

Semifinals

|}

Final
March 22, SRC Veli Jože, Poreč

|}

References

External links 
FIBA European Cup Winner's Cup 1978–79 linguasport.com
FIBA European Cup Winner's Cup 1978–79

Cup
FIBA Saporta Cup